Thengapattanam  (also referred to as "Thengapattinam", thennaipattinam" and "thenpattinam" ), named after dense coconut grooves, is a major trade and tourism centre in the painkulam panchayath along the coastal plains of Kanyakumari district. Thengapattanam, once part of Travancore and later Kerala, was added to Tamil Nadu on 1 November 1956 along with some parts of today's Kanniyakumari District.

Etymology
Thengappattanam derives its name from the abundance of coconut groves sprout along the vast estuary, meaning the town/city with coconut trees in abundance. The word Thenga(i) is found in Malayalam/Tamil refers to coconut/palm; The suffix "pattanam" is derived from "pattinam", a Tamil word which means coastal town or a city. Thus "Thenga+pattanam" became Thengapattanam in the later years. Also, acclaimed Malayalam/Arabic novels on Islamic history refers to this town as Naariyal pathathan, Naariyal meaning "coconut", and pathathan is an Arabic word for town.

History

Capital of "Thenga Nadu"

Chilappathikaram, the Tamil epic refers thengapattanam as the capital of "thenga nadu" – one of the 48 countries of lemuria, otherwise known as ‘kumari kandam’, where the Dravidian civilizations known as the ‘cradle of civilizations’ flourished.  The world renowned historical research traveler ‘dalami’ refers this place as a ‘harbour town’ in this book written in ad 100.  The king of ‘thenga nadu’ karunan thadangal is said to have ruled from here.

Dutch Invasion

This area, once under the domain of chera, pandya and nayakkar kings, was later ruled by the kings of travancore.  Attingal queen got the right to rule this area in ad 1700.  During this time in the middle of the 17th century, the naval forces headed by the Dutch colonel nicolfwar besieged this town and gained control of it.  The Dutch records of ‘wrin-de-herik’ state that after the take over a Dutch infantry division, a go down and a church were established here in ad 1678.    In ad 1694, the forces attingal queen fought the Dutch, chased them out and regained its control.

The rule of Venad

The Dutch again attacked thengapattinam, when it became part of ‘venad’ under the rule of marthanda varma maharaja.  during this battle fought to chase out the Dutch, many Muslims lost their lives.

The ‘kuntadipattan paarai’ which came under the heavy attack of the Dutch cannons stand out to be a ‘living memorial’ today.  Later, due to the ‘Tamil nadu liberation movement’ this part was annexed to Tamil Nadu in 1956.

It is worth mentioning here that the famous raja kesavadas, the then divan of the king Rama varma of travancore was brought up in his youth in the well known ‘puthen veedu" here.

Geography

Topography
Thengapattanam is located in the South western coast of India bordering the Arabian sea to the west, western ghats to the north, and vast fertile plains with intermittent Rocky hills to the east. The town is 11 km into the Tamil Nadu border from Kerala. The Kerala state capital Thiruvananthapuram is 45 km away from here, whereas Nagercoil is 35 km away. It shares borders with Erayumanthurai, and Amsi villages on either side. The Thamirabarani River wraps around most parts of the Kanyakumari district and becomes Kuzhithurai River before reaching Thengapattanam Estuary.

The AVM Canal (Anantha Victoria Marthandam Canal) commissioned by Marthanda Varma Maharaja in the 1860s to facilitate smooth trade, and navigation, passes through this town, the waterway lost its signiface and consequently had to cess operation in the 1980s following the establishment of roadways, unmitigated moderation, and unlawful encroachments adjoining the canal. The Canal, while it functioned, merged with Thamirabarani River River at Thengapattanam, and formed a basin known as Valiyar.  The development project mooted to revive AVM Canal Waterways would link Thengapattanam with Kanyakumari in the east and Kasargode in the north-west in Kerala, when it becomes operational.

Geology

Thengapattanam is classified under the Seismic Zone III, indicating a moderate risk of damage from earthquakes.

Climate

The climate here is classified under Köppen–Geiger climate classification system  as As/Aw/Am, as an implication the town experiences moderate tropical climates ranging from monsoon to Savannah dry influenced by the vicinity to Thermal equator. The town has been an annual recipient of unusually high rainfall from both the North-East and South-west monsoons.
The South-western monsoon spans the months of June till September, and the North-Eastern monsoon period commences by the October and winds up in the mid or late December. On an average, the Town receives 2100mm of rainfall with 104 rainy days. 
The summer here, spanning from the month of May to late June, is tropical dry and may reach a peak of 34 °C. The average Humidity in summer is around 74% percentage, while in June the humidity surfaces the 90% mark. 
The temperature during winter, on the other hand, reaches a low of 20 °C as the night falls. The winter season is marked by high precipitation and moderate rainfall.

Tourist attraction 

Thengapattanam has a long seashore with ferry services available. Thengapattanam is a major tourist attraction in the Kanyakumari districtknown for its sea, river, canal, paddy fields, rocky mountains and lush green groves.  The water way mooted by the then travancore government popularly known as avm canal originates from Mangalore in Karnataka and reaches Thengapattinam without any hurdles.  Even now passengers and goods are ferried through this canal to places like Poothurai, Thoothoor, Vallavilai, Neerodi, Kollencode and Poovar.  The merger of the Tamiraparani River here with the Arabian Sea is considered to be especially beautiful. This has also been used to describe the merger of the river with sea (estuary / firth) known as "Pozhi" in local vernacular

As one of the few picnic spots in the district, the town contains tiny hill-tops where cool wind blows throughout the year.

Demographics

Religion
Thengapattanam totally has 6 mosques

The six mosques, including the Valiya Palli, the landmark of this beautiful town, are situated at five vital areas, making it convenient for all the people to come and offer their prayers.  The Valiya Palli, which is at the centre of Thengapattanam, is surrounded on the four sides at the north near the bus stand by Rifai Masjid, at the west byKuzhathu Palli, at the west on the river bank of Valiyar by Attupalli, which is situated on the rocky hill and on the south close to the beach by Muhiyuddin Masjid. Chenta Palli, the ruins of which are present on the hilly rock at the eastern side is still considered as a holy place.

Thengapattanam also has Christians which each coastal area has one church from mullorthurai to kodi munnai. Not only in coastal areas amsi, maniyaramkuntru, arasakulam also has churches.

Hindus are less in thengapattanam.

Life style
It is a town which has close links with nearby towns as Thuckalay, Thiruvithancode, Colachel, Midalam, Enayam, Enayam Puthenthurai, Poothurai, Nambali and Poovar in the nearby Kerala State.  Marriage and social relations thrive among the people of these towns.  Other than the above, Thengapattinam has closely connected by trade and social relations with Trivandrum, the capital city of Kerala State.  A big number of people from Thengapattinam engage in various trade activities in Trivandrum. Houses, here, are built with separate compounds for each house.  Sweet drinking water is in plenty with each house a separate well in it.

A proportionate number of people pursue trade and business activities whereas a large chunk has moved to various Gulf countries to earn their livelihood.  'Gulf' is craze here that it is not uncommon to hear that a male member of a house is working in U.A.E., Bahrain, Saudi Arabia and Oman.  Families living here are inter related that they celebrate family gatherings with the help of each other not feeling the absence of male-members.  Though the majority of men fold is in 'Gulf', their hears go out to reach the dear and near ones in time of happiness and distress.  It is common here to see a handful of men enjoying their vacation from Gulf every day.

Thengapattinam is a main commercial hub for more than 50 small surrounding places, to name a few are, Mulloor Thurai, Raman Thurai, Enayam, Enayam Puthen Thurai, Erayumman Thurai, Poothurai, Panankal Mukku, Arasa Kulam, Keezhkulam, Chentharai, Amsi, Painkulam, Parakkani, Maniyaran Kunnu etc.

A daily market locally known as "Anthi Kadai" is a main hub here for the localers and surrounding villagers for their business and trade activities.

Religious Antiquity

Thengapattinam has the unique and rare distinction of being one of the few first places in India where Islam was propagated and accepted during the time of Muhammad.  Islam got firmly rooted here due to the peaceful propagation of the great spiritual leader malik ibn deenar who came from Arabia in the 7th century a.d. through kodungalloor in kerala.  His Arabic team built a big mosque here made of hard rocks which is known here as ‘valiapalli’.  The ancient Arabic history book ‘rihlathul muluk’ states that the headquarters of syed ubaithath kazhi’ appointed as the religious propaganda secretary of the district was located here.  Many Islamic religious scholars later came to this place to propagate Islam.

The mosque built of hard rocky stones knows as malik ibn dinar palli or valia palli, the aatttupalli built on the rocky mountains by the shores of the sea and river bank, the mohideen palli located near the canal in thoppu, the chenta palli built on kuntadipattan paarai, the rifai palli located close to the bus station and the khaja palli located by the shores of the Arabian sea are the mosques of this tiny town.

Work of Literature

The great poets kunju moosa pillai and alim lebbai haji whose famous literary works include the two epic poems and 14 other works such as ‘masala maalai’ ammanai’, were the natives of this town who lived here in the 18th century.  Other poets of literary renown fakkir meeran pillai, Mohammed pulavar and thoppu noohkhan also lived here during the same.

Language

Tamil is the major language here and a minority of people speaks Malayalam. Many People are bi-lingual who speak both Tamil and Malayalam.  English is also spoken and understood.  Tamil is spoken with Malayalam accent.  Tamil spoken here is difficult to understand for other Tamils of the state.  Some words originated from the influence of various cultures, such as Olungu (mosquito) etc. is spoken and understood only by the natives.  The impact of Malabar Muslim culture is very much felt here.  One example for this is the usage of Arabi-Malayalam (Malayalam language written in Arabic script) which can only read by those who know Arabic and understood only by those who know Malayalam.

Economy
Thengapattanam is famous for fisheries, sea products and coconut trees. Thengapattanam's economy has been increasing after the start of harbour construction. Fishing harbour plays an Important role in its economy.

Transport

Road

Road transport is the main mode of transport in this town. This town has bus services from
Marthandam, Nagercoil, Kanyakumari, Trivandrum. Taxis are also available there for short trips. Autos are available mostly. Most of the people use scooters and bikes.

Railway
The nearest railway station to Thengapattanam is at Kuzhithurai which is 12 km away.

Air
The nearest airport to the Thengapattanam is at Trivandrum which is almost 35 km away.

Sports
Cricket is the most popular game here like the rest of the nation. Football, volleyball and beach cricket is also played here.

See also
Munchirai
Kanyakumari
Marthandam

References

Cities and towns in Kanyakumari district